The 1921 FA Cup final was contested by Tottenham Hotspur and Wolverhampton Wanderers, which at the time was a Football League Second Division club, at Stamford Bridge. Spurs won by a single goal, scored by Jimmy Dimmock, eight minutes into the second half. The cup was presented to Tottenham Hotspur by King George V.

George Edmonds, who played on the losing side, was the last surviving player from the game. He died in December 1989 at the age of 96.

Route to the Final

Match details 

|valign="top" width="50%"|

|}

References

External links 
 Match report at www.fa-cupfinals.co.uk

FA Cup Finals
Final
FA Cup Final
FA Cup Final 1921
FA Cup Final 1921
FA Cup
FA Cup Final
FA Cup Final